Khok Makok railway station is a railway station located in Non Hom Subdistrict, Mueang Prachinburi District, Prachinburi Province.

References 

Railway stations in Thailand
Prachinburi province